Firas Mugrabi (born 24 July 1991) is an Arab-Israeli footballer who plays as an attacking midfielder for Ihud Bnei Shefa-'Amr.

Career
On 12 November 2008, Mugrabi made his debut for the senior side of Maccabi Netanya in the Toto Cup, scoring the second goal in a 2–0 victory over Beitar Jerusalem.
In 4 seasons with Netanya he played 121 games, scored 13 goals and also made 20 assists.

On 31 August 2012, he moved to RC Lens for a fee of €400,000 and a three-year contract worth approximately €450,000.

In January 2013, he was loaned back to Maccabi Netanya, as he said, " I would love to come back to Maccabi Netanya and help them stay in the first division". However, at the end of the season the team was relegated to the second division with Reuven Atar as their coach and Mugrabi returned to Lens due to his contract.

On 20 July 2013, Mugrabi was officially released from his contract with RC Lens, saying the team reached a full understanding of his situation and gave him the freedom to search for another club to play in.

On 5 June 2016, Firas Mugrabi officially signed a one-year contract with Maccabi Haifa, saying that he has finally achieved his childhood dream.

On 3 January 2017, Mugrabi signed a 3.5-year contract with Bnei Sakhnin.

On 5 August 2020, Mugrabi signed in Ihud Bnei Shefa-'Amr. In the next summer, Mugrabi appointed team coach.

International career
Mugrabi received his first call-up to the senior national team squad on 31 August 2016, for a 2018 FIFA World Cup qualifier against Italy.

Career statistics

References

External links
 
 

1991 births
Living people
Arab citizens of Israel
Arab-Israeli footballers
Israeli footballers
Maccabi Netanya F.C. players
RC Lens players
Bnei Sakhnin F.C. players
Maccabi Haifa F.C. players
Israeli expatriate footballers
Expatriate footballers in France
Israeli expatriate sportspeople in France
Israeli Premier League players
Footballers from Shefa-'Amr
Association football midfielders